Mount Christie is high peak in the Olympic Mountains of Washington in Olympic National Park. Mount Christie is located in the Queets-Quinault group. Precipitation on Mt. Christie drains into the Elwha River on the north side, and into the Quinault River on the south side.
The mountain was named to honor James Halbold Christie, who was the leader of the Seattle Press Expedition which first explored the unknown interior of the range in 1889–1890. The massif has several peaks, and the large Christie Glacier resides in the north cirque below the main summit.

Climate
Mount Chtistie is located in the marine west coast climate zone of western North America. Most weather fronts originate in the Pacific Ocean, and travel northeast toward the Olympic Mountains. As fronts approach, they are forced upward by the peaks of the Olympic Range, causing them to drop their moisture in the form of rain or snowfall (Orographic lift). As a result, the Olympics experience high precipitation, especially during the winter months. During winter months, weather is usually cloudy, but, due to high pressure systems over the Pacific Ocean that intensify during summer months, there is often little or no cloud cover during the summer. Because of maritime influence, snow tends to be wet and heavy, resulting in avalanche danger.

See also
List of mountains of the United States

References

External links
 
 
 
 Christie Glacier aerial photo PBase.com

Mountains of Jefferson County, Washington
Mountains of Washington (state)
Olympic Mountains
Landforms of Olympic National Park